Gelora Bung Karno Sports Palace (abbreviated as Istora), the formerly name Istora Senayan is an indoor sporting arena located in Gelora Bung Karno Sports Complex, Jakarta, Indonesia. The capacity of the arena after 2018 reopening is 7,166. This arena is usually used for badminton tournaments. Its maiden event was the 1961 Thomas Cup.

It was also used during the 1962 Asian Games and was renovated to host the 2018 edition. Its first post-renovation event was the 2018 Indonesia Masters. During the latter Games, it hosted the badminton and later stages of basketball events.

The arena originally was planned to stage the 2023 FIBA Basketball World Cup and becoming the only Indonesian venue in the three-country joint bid but was moved to a newly-built arena inside the complex. It hosted the 2022 FIBA Asia Cup instead.

Development
Istora had a U-shaped indoor lobby attached on its front since some time after the 1960s to 2016. The court and tribune were surrounded by multi-functional rooms. Those were demolished during the subsequent renovation. The rooms are incorporated underneath the tribune, leaving no other buildings attached to it.

During the latest renovation, there were already some delft blue single seats installed on the mid-section of west and east tribune along with yellow (4 corners) and green (mid-section of north and south tribune) wooden bleachers. Those were scrapped and replaced by single seats, consist of 3 shades of grey. However, to preserve the memory of the old Istora, there are five rows of seat using new all-brown wooden bleachers, placed near Gate 1.

Notable concerts

Notable international sporting events

1961, 1967, 1973, and 1979 Thomas Cups
1962 and 2018 Asian Games
1975 Uber Cup
1980 and 1989 IBF World Championships
1986, 1994, 2004, and 2008 Thomas & Uber Cups
1989 Sudirman Cup
1992 IBF World Junior Championships
2015 BWF World Championships
2015 World Wushu Championships
2018 Asian Para Games
2022 FIBA Asia Cup

Gallery

See also
Gelora Bung Karno Sports Complex
Gelora Bung Karno Stadium

References

External links

Profile on GBK Sports Complex official website 

Indoor arenas in Indonesia
Basketball venues in Indonesia
Boxing venues in Indonesia
Gymnastics venues in Indonesia
Volleyball venues in Indonesia
Sports venues in Jakarta
Badminton venues in Jakarta
Basketball venues in Jakarta
Boxing venues in Jakarta
Gymnastics venues in Jakarta
Volleyball venues in Jakarta
Badminton in Indonesia
Venues of the 1962 Asian Games
Venues of the 2018 Asian Games
Asian Games badminton venues
Asian Games basketball venues
Asian Games table tennis venues
Southeast Asian Games badminton venues
Southeast Asian Games basketball venues
Sports venues completed in 1961